Khao Nom Nang, "female breast mountain", is a  high mountain in the Tenasserim Hills in Kanchanaburi Province, Thailand.

Description
Khao Nom Nang rises above the surrounding limestone hills between Nong Pet and Chong Sadao east of Route 3199. The mountain is in the Erawan National Park area.

See also
List of mountains in Thailand
Breast-shaped hills

References

External links
 National Parks of Thailand, Department of National Parks

Geography of Kanchanaburi province
Mountains of Thailand
Tenasserim Hills